The Raiders–Steelers rivalry is an NFL rivalry between the Las Vegas Raiders and Pittsburgh Steelers. Both teams compete in the American Football Conference (AFC). The historically bitter rivalry started with the Steelers' first playoff win over the Raiders by way of Franco Harris's Immaculate Reception on December 23, 1972. The two teams met in the playoffs for five consecutive seasons (1972–76), an NFL record that has yet to be matched. The series was regarded as one of the fiercest rivalries in the history of professional sports, especially in the 1970s. Las Vegas is one of four AFC teams with a winning overall record against Pittsburgh (the Denver Broncos, Jacksonville Jaguars, and New England Patriots are the other three). CBS Sports ranked this rivalry as the best NFL rivalry of the 1970s.

History

1970–1984: Beginnings of the rivalry and early success
The inaugural game of the rivalry was during Week 6 of the 1970 season where the Raiders crushed the visiting Steelers 31–14. The Steelers would miss out on the postseason while the Raiders went on to lose to the Colts in the AFC Championship.

Two seasons later in 1972, the Raiders visited the Steelers in Week 1. The Steelers were more competitive than in previous seasons and won the game 34–28.  Both teams finished first in their divisions (Steelers 11–3, Raiders 10–3–1) and eventually went on to play each other in the postseason. The resulting game, the Immaculate Reception, spawned a heated rivalry between the Raiders and Steelers, a rivalry that was at its peak during the 1970s, when both teams were among the best in the league and both were known for their hard-hitting, physical play (The Steelers won 13–7).

The teams met in the playoffs in each of the next four seasons, starting with the Raiders' 33–14 victory in the 1973 divisional playoffs. Pittsburgh used the AFC Championship Game victories over Oakland (24–13 at Oakland in 1974 and 16–10 at Pittsburgh in 1975) as a springboard to victories in Super Bowl IX and Super Bowl X, before the Raiders notched a 24–7 AFC Championship Game victory at home in 1976 on their way to winning Super Bowl XI. To date, the two last met in the playoffs in 1983 when the eventual Super Bowl champion Raiders, playing in Los Angeles at the time, crushed the Steelers 38–10.

1984–2002
The rivalry cooled off in the late 1980s, mainly due to the Raiders on-field struggles since appearing in Super Bowl XVIII. The teams also met infrequently for several years, playing only twice in the Raiders' final 10 seasons in Los Angeles, both at the Los Angeles Memorial Coliseum. The Los Angeles Raiders never played in Pittsburgh, as the teams went 20 years (1980–2000) without facing each other in the Steel City.

In Week 3 of the 1990 season, the Steelers would visit the Raiders and get beat 21–3.  Both teams would have winning records (Raiders 12–4, Steelers 9–7) but the Steelers sat out of the playoffs while the Raiders made a trip to the AFC Championship only to see themselves get knocked out by the Buffalo Bills.

In Week 13 of the 1994 season, the Steelers visited the Raiders and crushed them by a final score of 21–3 in what was the Steelers last visit to Los Angeles until at least 2019, due to the Raiders moving back to Oakland the following year and the Los Angeles Rams moving to St. Louis as well until their return to Los Angeles in 2016. The Steelers would make the playoffs with the Raiders sitting out despite both teams having winning records (Steelers 12–4, Raiders 9–7) in a reverse of the 1990 season.  The Steelers were eventually knocked out of the playoffs by the Raiders' division rival Chargers in the AFC Championship.

In Week 15 of the 1995 season, the Steelers visited the Raiders and crushed them 29–10.  The Raiders would miss out on the postseason while the Steelers went on ahead to lose to the Dallas Cowboys in Super Bowl XXX.

In Week 14 of the 2000 season, the 10–2 Raiders had possession of home field advantage throughout the playoffs and visited the 6–6 Steelers. The Steelers would go on to win 21–20 and prevented the Raiders from obtaining home field advantage as the AFC's first seed would eventually fall into the hands of the Titans.

In Week 2 of the 2002 season, the Raiders visited the Steelers and won 30–17.  Both teams would have winning records (Raiders 11–5, Steelers 10–5–1) and possession of the 1st and 3rd seeds of the playoffs and win their divisions.  Despite this, neither team played each other in the postseason as the Steelers were eventually knocked out by the Titans while the Raiders went on to lose against the Buccaneers in Super Bowl XXXVII. Since then, the Raiders collapsed after losing the Super Bowl and lost quarterback Rich Gannon to a career-ending injury in 2004, missing the playoffs each year until 2016, while the Steelers have stayed fairly successful under new quarterback Ben Roethlisberger, winning two more Super Bowls and appearing in a third one.

2003–present

Even with the competitive slide of the Raiders, the games between the two clubs have still seen memorable moments. The Raiders in 2009 rallied to defeat the Steelers 27–24 in a game where the two teams combined for five touchdowns in the fourth quarter, the game lead changed hands on all five, and the game winner by future Steelers backup quarterback Bruce Gradkowski came with nine seconds to go in the fourth. A year later the Steelers routed the Raiders 35–3 in a game famous for a brawl following a sucker-punch of Steelers quarterback Ben Roethlisberger by the Raiders' Richard Seymour.

In Week 3 of 2012, the Raiders rallied from down 31–21 in the fourth quarter to win 34–31 on a last-second Sebastian Janikowski field goal. The game saw several skirmishes between the two teams and NFL Network's rebroadcast of the game made a point of drawing parallels with the rivalry's 1970s apex.

In Week 8 of 2013, the Steelers went to Oakland to take on the Raiders and their then-starting quarterback Terrelle Pryor. Pryor ran for a 93-yard touchdown which would be the longest run by any QB in NFL history. The Steelers attempted a late-game rally but came up short, losing 21–18.

In Week 9 of the 2015 season, the Raiders visited the Steelers in Pittsburgh. Sophomore Raiders quarterback Derek Carr threw for four touchdowns and an endzone interception. They erased a 35–21 fourth quarter deficit and tied it at 35 with 1:15 left, but despite losing Ben Roethlisberger to a foot injury the Steelers behind backup quarterback Landry Jones drove to the Raiders one-yard line; the key play was a 57-yard catch by Antonio Brown on his way to a franchise-record 284 receiving yards. The winning field goal ended a 38–35 Steelers triumph in the highest-scoring game in the rivalry since 1980.

The teams met in Week 14 of the 2018 season in what was the Steelers' last trip to Oakland, due to the Raiders relocating to Las Vegas in 2020. In the game, the Steelers were able to take a late 21–17 lead with a Ben Roethlisberger touchdown pass to JuJu Smith-Schuster, but Oakland quickly responded on the next drive, scoring a touchdown to retake the lead in less than two minutes. The Steelers advanced deep into Oakland territory with a quick pass to James Washington, who pitched it to Smith-Schuster for a big gain in the waning seconds of the game, but lost to the Raiders after kicker Chris Boswell slipped and missed a potential game-tying field goal. The final score was 24–21 Oakland. The game, as it turns out, would have major playoff effects on Pittsburgh. The loss to Oakland, combined with a loss at the New Orleans Saints two weeks later, allowed the 10–6 Baltimore Ravens to win the AFC North after winning their final game against the Cleveland Browns, and took the 9–6–1 Steelers out of the postseason.

Following the season, the Steelers were forced to trade their talented but disgruntled receiver Antonio Brown to the Raiders. However, his stint with the Raiders was short-lived as he was released before the Raiders' first regular season game.

The two teams met again in Week 2 of the 2021 season at Heinz Field in Pittsburgh, with this being the first meeting between the two clubs since the Raiders relocated to Las Vegas in 2020. The Raiders would once again upset the Steelers for the second time in four seasons, winning 26-17 behind 382 yards passing and two touchdowns from Derek Carr. The game was also notable for the ejection of Steelers offensive lineman Trai Turner early in the fourth quarter, as a result of Turner spitting on Raiders linebacker Marquel Lee during an altercation between the two clubs following a Steelers touchdown, a 25-yard pass from Ben Roethlisberger to rookie running back Najee Harris. The victory turned out to be a crucial one for the Raiders, as both teams would make the playoffs that season, but the Raiders' win helped them obtain the fifth seed in the AFC while the Steelers had to settle for the seventh seed.

The two teams met for a primetime game on December 24, 2022, to mark the 50th anniversary of the Immaculate Reception. The number 32 of Harris—who died four days prior to the game, and was originally scheduled to be in attendance—was retired during a ceremony at halftime. After trailing 10-6 after some time in the fourth quarter, Steelers rookie QB Kenny Pickett would connect with fellow rookie receiver George Pickens on a late touchdown pass to take a 13-10 lead.  After getting the ball back on offense, Derek Carr threw a deep pass intended for Hunter Renfrow that turned out to be the eventual game-losing interception by Cameron Sutton. This was the lowest-scoring game between the teams since 1984, and also served as Carr's final start and game as a Raider, as he was benched by the team for their final two games and then released the following offseason.

Results

|-
| 
| style="|Raiders  31–14
| Oakland-Alameda County Coliseum
| Raiders  1–0
| Steelers and Raiders join AFC after AFL-NFL Merger.
|-
| 
| style="|Steelers  34–28
| Three Rivers Stadium
| Tie  1–1
| 
|- 
! 1972 playoffs
! style="|Steelers  13–7
! Three Rivers Stadium
! Steelers  2–1
! AFC Divisional Round. Franco Harris makes "immaculate reception" to win game for Pittsburgh.
|-
| 
| style="|Steelers  17–9
| Oakland-Alameda County Coliseum
| Steelers  3–1
|
|- 
! 1973 playoffs
! style="|Raiders  33–14
! Oakland-Alameda County Coliseum
! Steelers  3–2
! AFC Divisional Round.
|-
| 
| style="|Raiders  17–0
| Three Rivers Stadium
| Tie  3–3
| Only shutout game of the rivalry.
|- 
! 1974 playoffs
! style="|Steelers  24–13
! Oakland-Alameda County Coliseum
! Steelers  4–3
! AFC Championship Game. Steelers win Super Bowl IX.
|- 
! 1975 playoffs
! style="|Steelers  16–10
! Three Rivers Stadium
! Steelers  5–3
! Second straight AFC Championship Game meeting. Steelers win Super Bowl X.
|-
| 
|style="|Raiders  31–28
| Oakland-Alameda County Coliseum
| Steelers  5–4
| 
|- 
! 1976 playoffs
! style="|Raiders  24–7
! Oakland-Alameda County Coliseum
! Tie  5–5
! Third straight AFC Championship Game meeting. Met in the playoffs an active NFL record five consecutive seasons. Raiders win Super Bowl XI.
|-
| 
|style="|Raiders  17–6
| Three Rivers Stadium
| Raiders  6–5
| 
|-

|-
| 
| style="| Raiders  45–34
| Three Rivers Stadium
| Raiders  7–5
| Raiders win Super Bowl XV.
|-
| 
| style="| Raiders  30–27
| Oakland-Alameda County Coliseum
| Raiders  8–5
| Raiders' last season in Oakland before moving to Los Angeles.
|- 
! 1983 playoffs
! style="| Raiders  38–10
! Los Angeles Memorial Coliseum
! Raiders  9–5
! AFC Divisional Round. Only postseason meeting with the Raiders based in LA. Most recent postseason meeting to date. Raiders win six straight meetings. Raiders win Super Bowl XVIII.
|-
| 
| style="| Steelers  13–7
| Los Angeles Memorial Coliseum
| Raiders  9–6
| 
|-

|-
| 
| style="| Raiders  20–3
| Los Angeles Memorial Coliseum
| Raiders  10–6
| 
|-
| 
| style="| Steelers  21–3
| Los Angeles Memorial Coliseum
| Raiders  10–7
| Raiders' last season in Los Angeles before returning to Oakland
|-
| 
| style="| Steelers  29–10
| Oakland-Alameda County Coliseum
| Raiders  10–8
| Steelers lose Super Bowl XXX.
|-

|-
| 
| style="| Steelers  21–20
| Three Rivers Stadium
| Raiders  10–9
| Raiders' first visit to Pittsburgh in 20 years. Steelers' final year in Three Rivers Stadium.
|-
| 
| style="| Raiders  30–17
| Heinz Field
| Raiders  11–9
| First meeting at Heinz Field. Raiders lose Super Bowl XXXVII.
|-
| 
| style="| Steelers  27–7
| Heinz Field
| Raiders  11–10
| 
|-
| 
| style="| Steelers  24–21
| Heinz Field
| Tie  11–11
| 
|-
| 
| style="| Raiders  20–13
| McAfee Coliseum
| Raiders  12–11
| First start in the series for Ben Roethlisberger.
|-
| 
| style="| Raiders  27–24
| Heinz Field
| Raiders  13–11
| 
|-

|-
| 
| style="| Steelers  35–3
| Heinz Field
| Raiders  13–12
| Steelers lose Super Bowl XLV.
|-
| 
| style="| Raiders  34–31
| O.co Coliseum
| Raiders  14–12
| 
|-
| 
| style="| Raiders  21–18
| O.co Coliseum
| Raiders  15–12
| 
|-
| 
| style="| Steelers  38–35
| Heinz Field
| Raiders  15–13
| 
|- 
| 
| style="| Raiders  24–21
| Oakland Coliseum
| Raiders  16–13
| Steelers lose game after missing last-minute field goal. Final matchup in Oakland.
|-

|-
| 
| style="| Raiders  26–17
| Heinz Field
| Raiders  17–13
| First game between the two teams since Raiders relocate to Las Vegas. Final start in the series for Ben Roethlisberger.
|-
| 
| style="| Steelers  13–10
| Acrisure Stadium
| Raiders  17–14
| Celebration of the 50th anniversary of the Immaculate Reception. Final start in the series for Derek Carr. 
|-
| 
|
| Allegiant Stadium
|
| First meeting in Las Vegas.
|-

|-
| Regular season
| style="|
| Raiders 8–4
| Steelers 7–6
| 
|-
| Postseason
| Tie 3–3
| Raiders 3–1
| Steelers 2–0
| AFC Divisional playoffs: 1972–1973, 1983. AFC Championship Game: 1974–1976.
|-
| Regular and postseason 
| style="|
| Raiders 11–5
| Steelers 9–6
| 
|-

References

Las Vegas Raiders
Pittsburgh Steelers
National Football League rivalries
Las Vegas Raiders rivalries
Pittsburgh Steelers rivalries